Glasgow in Lanarkshire was a royal burgh that returned one commissioner to the Parliament of Scotland and to the Convention of Estates.

After the Acts of Union 1707, Glasgow, Dumbarton, Renfrew and Rutherglen formed the Glasgow district of burghs, returning one member between them to the House of Commons of Great Britain.

List of burgh commissioners

 1630 (convention): Gabriel Cunningham, provost
 1639–1641: Patrick Bell, provost 
 1643–44, 1644: James Bell 
 1645: Colin Campbell of Elie
 1645–1647, 1649–51: George Porterfield 
 1661–1663: John Bell, provost 
 1665 (convention), 1667 (convention), 1669–1674: William Anderson, provost 
 1678 (convention): James Campbell, provost
 1681–1682: John Bell, provost 
 1685–86: John Johnston of Clauchrie, provost
 1689 (convention), 1689–1702: John Anderson of Dowhill, merchant-burgess 
 1702–1707: Hugh Montgomerie of Busbie, provost

References

See also
 List of constituencies in the Parliament of Scotland at the time of the Union

Burghs represented in the Parliament of Scotland (to 1707)
History of Glasgow
Politics of Glasgow
Constituencies disestablished in 1707
1707 disestablishments in Scotland